Charismatic Adventists are a segment of Adventism, specifically the Seventh-day Adventist Church, as well as some other Adventist denominations, such as the Adventist Church of Promise and the International Missionary Society of Seventh-Day Adventist Church Reform Movement, that is closely related to "Progressive Adventism", a liberal movement within the church.

Beliefs

Music 
Like progressive Adventists, charismatics are typically open to a variety of styles of worship music in church including Contemporary Christian Music.

Speaking in tongues

Adventists commonly believe that speaking in tongues refers to speaking in earthly languages not known to the user, so the user could communicate to those from distant lands, so it is always for a purpose. Not to ecstatic speech or a personal prayer language or similar as practiced by many charismatic and Pentecostal Christians. The 1991 National Church Life Survey in Australia found that approximately 5% of Australian Adventists approve of and/or speak in tongues, whereas 11% have no opinion and approximately 85% disapprove. This was the highest disapproval rating amongst all denominations surveyed.

An Adventist with an acceptance for charismatic experiences could be considered progressive in one sense, particularly because traditional and mainstream Adventist views reject the Pentecostal and charismatic movements.

Fundamental Beliefs
Although belief "17. Spiritual Gifts and Ministries" of the official 28 Fundamental Beliefs of Adventists affirms that spiritual gifts do continue into the present. Adventists more often limit it to the ability to speak unlearned human languages, or "xenoglossy"; and have generally rejected the form of tongues practised by many charismatic and Pentecostal Christians, described as ecstatic speech or a "personal prayer language".

Supporting this position is Gerhard Hasel, who believed the practice refers to unknown human languages only, and not angelic languages nor ecstatic speech. His document has been frequently cited by Adventists. David Asscherick also believes tongues are xenoglossy only.

See also other Adventist commentators.

History

Modern
Few modern Adventist individuals and churches have charismatic leanings, or practice speaking in tongues, after coming into contact with its practices such as in the "Holy Flesh movement" in Indiana around the turn of the 19th century which Ellen White quickly rebuked." Some claim they see evidence in some teachings on holiness by medical doctor John Harvey Kellogg, and Jones and Waggoner of 1888 fame.
Jon Paulien describes "the Montanists regarded as heresy, early charismatics who believed that every Christian was
as inspired as the apostles or the Scriptures. The focus on the Spirit as the key to church life is
now mirrored by some in Adventist circles as well."

In September 1999 "Discerning the Spirit" conferences were held in the Australian part of the church.

Adventist churches with charismatic leanings are very rare and controversial within the denomination, and rejected on the whole. New Life Celebration church was one of the earliest Adventist "celebration churches". Some such churches have had tension with the Adventist leadership, and some have left the Adventist denomination. Retired Australian Adventist pastor, evangelist and former official of the Greater Sydney Conference, E. Bruce Price has criticized the churches, which he says were introduced to the world Adventist church in the 1980s.

According to Adventist historians Bull and Lockhart, "Adventist worship is generally restrained and carefully organized".

See also
 Seventh-day Adventist theology
 Progressive Adventism
 Historic Adventism
 Seventh-day Adventist worship

References

Books:
 G. Edward Reid, Battle of the Spirits,

External links
 Counterfeit Revivals
 Ancient Future: Counterfeit Revivals And The New Spirituality Movement (Audio Sermons)
 "The Church and Worship" by C. Raymond Holmes. Biblical Research Institute
 "Applause, Hand Waving and Drumming In The Church" by Samuel Pipim
 "Shall We Dance?" by Adventist Scholar Samuele Bacchiocchi
 "Music: Its Role, Qualities, and Influence as Set Forth in the Writings of Ellen G. White". Ellen G. White Estate, compiled 1972
 Worship, Radical Ritual, by C. Raymond Holmes. Biblical Research Institute

 
Adventism
Seventh-day Adventist theology
Adventism